Benedikt Kohl (born March 31, 1988) is a German professional ice hockey defenceman who plays for the Straubing Tigers of the Deutsche Eishockey Liga (DEL).

Playing career
After three seasons with EHC Wolfsburg, Kohl transferred to his fourth DEL club, ERC Ingolstadt, on a one-year contract on May 8, 2014. During the 2014–15 season, Kohl was signed to a four-year contract extension to remain in Ingolstadt on January 20, 2015.

Kohl played in Ingolstadt for 5 seasons before leaving as a free agent following the 2018–19 season, agreeing to a one-year contract with the Straubing Tigers on April 3, 2019.

Career statistics

Regular season and playoffs

International

References

External links

1988 births
Living people
Adler Mannheim players
Augsburger Panther players
People from Berchtesgaden
Sportspeople from Upper Bavaria
German ice hockey defencemen
Grizzlys Wolfsburg players
Heilbronner Falken players
ERC Ingolstadt players
Straubing Tigers players